Eminia is the scientific name for two genera of organisms and may refer to:

Eminia, a genus of birds in the family Cisticolidae, containing a single species, Eminia lepida (grey-capped warbler)
Eminia (plant), a genus of plants in the family Fabaceae